John A. Carter (May 15, 1933 – December 29, 2017) was a farmer and former politician in Newfoundland. He represented St. John's North in the Newfoundland House of Assembly from 1971 to 1989.

Biography
Carter was born to Allan and Eda (Pittman) in St. John's, Newfoundland and Labrador on May 15, 1933. Carter attended school at Bishop Field College and Saint Bonaventure's College, and he is a Memorial University Of Newfoundland graduate. In 1960, Carter married Brenda Marjorie Murphy.

He was elected to the provincial legislature (the Newfoundland and Labrador House of Assembly) in 1971 as the member for St. John's North, and served for a time as Minister of Education and Youth for Premier Frank Moores. Carter was reelected five times by the voters of St. John's North and continued to represent the district until 1989. Carter continued to own and operated Mount Scio Farm, a major Atlantic Canada producer of summer savoury. He died on December 29, 2017, at the age of 84 after a brief illness.

References 

1933 births
2017 deaths
Canadian farmers
Progressive Conservative Party of Newfoundland and Labrador MHAs
Members of the Executive Council of Newfoundland and Labrador
Politicians from St. John's, Newfoundland and Labrador